Golders Hill Park is a formal park in Golders Green, London. It is managed by the City of London Corporation as part of the parkland and commons in and near Hampstead Heath, and is part of the Hampstead Heath Site of Metropolitan Importance for Nature Conservation. Unlike the rest of the Heath, Golders Hill Park is closed at night.

It adjoins the West Heath part of Hampstead Heath, and was formerly surmounted by a large house which was bombed during World War II. It is chiefly grassy parkland, but it also has a formal, beautifully tended, flower garden next to a duck pond with a small humpback bridge, a separate water garden, which leads onto a larger pond, and a small free zoo, recently renovated, mostly in one bloc but with a separate pen primarily for fallow deer. A butterfly house is open at certain times in summer.  There are also tennis courts, a playground, and croquet lawns. A restaurant stands at the top of the park, near the site of the original house.

During the summer, children's activities are organised and through June and July there is live music on the bandstand on Sunday afternoons. Unlike most of Hampstead Heath, dogs must be kept on a lead in the park.

Species
The zoo contains a variety of animals and birds, including donkeys, coatis, a rhea, maras, red junglefowl, Lady Amherst's pheasants, red-legged seriemas, ring-tailed lemurs, kookaburras, sacred ibis, cattle egrets, little egrets, Eurasian eagle-owls and white-naped cranes.

See also
 List of public art in Barnet
 Nature reserves in Barnet
 Barnet parks and open spaces

References

External links

Nature reserves in the London Borough of Barnet
Parks and open spaces in the London Borough of Barnet
Golders Green